Ebeye (Marshallese: , or  in older orthography, ; locally, after the English pronunciation) is the most populous island of Kwajalein Atoll in the Marshall Islands, as well as the center for Marshallese culture in the Ralik Chain of the archipelago. Over 50% of the population is estimated to be under the age of 18.

History

Etymology
When Christian missionaries first arrived in the Marshall Islands, they introduced Latin script writing and orthographized the Marshallese language. Originally, Ebeye was written Ebeje by Europeans ( in modern orthography, pronounced ), which (according to elders of the atoll) means "making something out of nothing." However, the colonial German administration mispronounced the J as if it were German language , and foreign observers recorded the resulting pronunciation as Ebeye. During the Japanese period, though, the island's pronunciation in katakana, re-approximated Marshallese. Because most of the modern Marshallese residents of Ebeye don't have family roots on the island, the American pronunciation has stuck, and is the usual name for Ebeye among the island's current population. This pronunciation has even been adapted to Marshallese orthography, so that there are now two synonymous Marshallese names for the island officially and historically , and locally .

World War II

The Imperial Japanese Navy constructed a seaplane base on Ebeye in the early 1940s. Following the Battle of Kwajalein from 31 January to 3 February 1944, Ebeye was occupied by US forces. On 7 March the 107th Naval Construction Battalion was sent to Ebeye to redevelop the seaplane base. The Seabees repaired the existing  pier, adding a  ell extension, and also repaired a  Japanese H-shaped pier. The Seabees assembled a pontoon wharf and pontoon barges for transporting damaged carrier aircraft to repair units ashore. Further installations on Ebeye consisted of housing in floored tents and Quonset huts, a 150-bed dispensary, four magazines,  of covered storage, and a  aviation-gasoline tank farm.

Emigration from the Mid-Atoll Corridor
Before the early 1950s, a large number of present-day residents of Ebeye lived on small islands throughout Kwajalein Atoll. When Kwajalein island started to be used as a support base for the nuclear tests conducted at Bikini Atoll and Enewetak Atoll, Marshallese residents of Kwajalein were relocated by U.S. authorities to a small, planned community constructed on Ebeye, which was largely unpopulated and had served as a Japanese seaplane base before the Pacific War.

In 1950, the US Navy constructed a LORAN station on Ebeye. It was disestablished in 1977.

With the advent of the Nike-Zeus anti-ballistic missile testing program of the 1960s, the U.S. military decided for safety and security reasons to evacuate slightly more than 100 residents of the central part of the atoll to create a zone where unarmed guided missiles could be targeted from the continental United States.

Subsequent population growth by migration from outlying rural atolls and islands throughout the Marshalls created a housing shortage and problems with resources throughout the following decades. Some of the original Ebeye inhabitants with land rights did not feel adequately compensated  for the tenants who came to live on their land even though their paramount chief had worked with the Trust Territory to move them there.

Geography
Ebeye is the most populous island of Kwajalein Atoll in the Marshall Islands, as well as the center for Marshallese culture in the Ralik Chain of the archipelago.  It comprises .

It is the sixth most densely populated island in the world.

Climate

Demographics
Ebeye has a population of more than 15,000.  In 2008, the population was 12,000. In 1968, the population was 3,000.

Refuge from nuclear fallout
Some of the residents of Ebeye are refugees or descendants of refugees from the effects of the 15-megaton Castle Bravo nuclear test at Bikini Atoll on 1 March 1954. The detonation unexpectedly rained nuclear fallout and two inches (50 mm) of radioactive snow on nearby Rongelap Atoll, which had not been evacuated as had Bikini. The 1954 American authorities then evacuated Rongelap and were returned in 1957 with extensive medical surveillance. In 1985, Greenpeace evacuated the inhabitants of Rongelap to Mejato (island in Kwajalein atoll). Ebeye was the final destination for many of them.

Health
Infant mortality on Ebeye is 3.0% . There have been recurrent outbreaks of cholera, dengue fever, and tuberculosis. In 1963 there was a polio outbreak, and in 1978 a measles outbreak. In 2009, the Ebeye Community Health Center was awarded a grant as part of the United States Stimulus for monitoring influenza (e.g. H1N1).

Economy
The Marshall Islands subsists primarily upon foreign aid and lease payments from the United States for the military use of Kwajalein Atoll. The United States provides $1.5 billion in aid under the Compact of Free Association, spread out over the 20 years of the agreement, which expires in 2023. Apart from this, handicrafts are produced and there is a small fishery.

See also
Queen of Peace Church, Ebeye

References

External links

 What It’s Like To Live On An Island Surrounded By Missile Tests
 Celebrating Survival in an 'Atypical Marshallese Community'
 Program Targets Crime On Overcrowded Ebeye
 Ebeye Public Elementary School
 Pearl of the Pacific

Populated places in the Marshall Islands
Kwajalein Atoll
Airfields of the United States Navy
Islands of the Marshall Islands
Closed installations of the United States Navy